The 2008 U.S. Virgin Islands Democratic presidential convention took place on February 9, 2008.  The convention chose 6 delegates, all pledged to Senator Barack Obama.  Each delegate, however, only counted for half a vote at the 2008 Democratic National Convention.  The Virgin Islands' delegation also included 6 unpledged "superdelegates" not bound by the results of the convention.

Results

See also 

 Democratic Party (United States) presidential primaries, 2008
 United States Virgin Islands Republican caucuses, 2008

References 

Virgin Islands
Democratic territorial convention
United States Virgin Islands Democratic caucuses